The Treasurer of Illinois is an elected official of the U.S. state of Illinois.  The office was created by the Constitution of Illinois.

Current Occupant
The current Treasurer of Illinois is Democrat Mike Frerichs.  He was first elected to head the State Treasury in 2014 in a close race with Republican Party candidate Tom Cross.

Duties of the Treasurer 
The Treasurer is responsible, pursuant to Article V, Section 18 of the state constitution, for the safekeeping and investment of the monies and securities deposited in the public funds of Illinois.  As such, the Treasurer is not the chief financial officer of Illinois. That post is reserved for a separate elected official, the Comptroller. Rather, the Treasurer functions as the chief banking and investment officer of the state.

The Illinois Constitution provides that the treasurer must, at the time of his or her election, be a United States citizen, at least 25 years old, and a resident of the state for at least 3 years preceding the election.

The Treasurer is fifth (behind the Lieutenant Governor, Attorney General, Secretary of State, and Comptroller, respectively) in the line of succession to the office of Governor of Illinois.

The Treasurer's office operates a web page describing the office's powers and duties.

List of office holders

Proposals to merge with Comptroller
Some observers have perceived an overlap between the offices of Treasurer of Illinois and Comptroller of Illinois, and have therefore proposed constitutional amendments to merge the two offices and earn administrative savings.  For example, HJRCA 14, considered by the Illinois General Assembly in 2007-2008, would have merged the two offices into the office of a single State Fiscal Officer.

In 2011, the incumbent Treasurer along with the Comptroller (also former Treasurer) Judy Baar Topinka introduced legislation to allow voters to decide whether the offices should be merged.  The legislation was opposed by Michael Madigan, Speaker of the Illinois House of Representatives.

References

External links 
 Illinois State Treasurer's Office

 
1818 establishments in Illinois Territory